Patricia Joanne "Jenny" O'Hara (born February 24, 1942) is an American film, television, and stage actress. She is best known for Dixie in My Sister Sam (1986–1988), Janet Heffernan in The King of Queens (2001–2007), and Nita in Big Love (2006–2009).

Personal life
O'Hara was born in Sonora, California. Her father, John B. O'Hara, was a salesman, and her mother, Edith (Hopkins) O'Hara, was a journalist and drama teacher, who founded and continued to run the 13th Street Repertory Company in New York City for many years before her death at age 103 in 2020. Jenny, her singer/actress younger sister Jill O'Hara, and her singer/guitarist brother Jack O'Hara, grew up amid their mother's pursuit of a theatrical career. John and Edith O'Hara eventually divorced.  Edith O'Hara directed a children's theater in Warren, Pennsylvania, where the two daughters occasionally acted.  Jenny O'Hara debuted on stage at age 5 at the Bushkill Playhouse in the Poconos.

Career
She spent a year at Carnegie Tech (now part of Carnegie-Mellon University) in Pittsburgh and a summer playing in stock theater, and then came to New York to study with Lee Strasberg and Sanford Meisner. In 1964 she appeared on Broadway in the dramatic play Dylan at the Plymouth Theatre opposite Sir Alec Guinness, and in 1969 appeared in the musical The Fig Leaves Are Falling at the Broadhurst Theatre with Dorothy Loudon. Her other Broadway credits include Promises, Promises, The Iceman Cometh, and The Odd Couple. 

In 1970, O'Hara succeeded her younger sister, Jill (who had been nominated for a Tony Award) in the musical 
Promises, Promises.  She graduated to television, both in series and made-for-TV features, including starring roles in: Brinks: The Great Robbery, The Return of the World's Greatest Detective, Blind Ambition and Blinded by the Light with Kristy McNichol.

She later worked in movies such as Career Opportunities, A Mother's Prayer, Mystic River, Matchstick Men, Extract and Devil; was part of the ensemble cast for the first season of The Facts of Life and the entire run of My Sister Sam; and had guest roles on television series such as Kojak, Charlie's Angels, Quinn Martin's Tales of the Unexpected (known in the United Kingdom as Twist in the Tale), Barnaby Jones, Barney Miller, Law & Order, The X-Files, Beverly Hills, 90210, NYPD Blue, ER, CHiPs, House M.D., Boston Legal, Reba, Six Feet Under, and Big Love. She has also made appearances over the years on various TV game shows.

On TV, O'Hara portrayed Ruth Manly on Black Beauty, Lottie Murphy in Costello, Rebecca in Highcliffe Manor, Janet Heffernan in The King of Queens, Muriel Spiegleman in Live In, Dixie Randazzo in My Sister Sam, and Lucy Dexter on Secrets of Midland Heights. She also had roles in the 2009 film, Extract, and the 2010 horror film, Devil.

O'Hara directed the off-Broadway play The Women Are No Different, which was about abuse of wives. In 1973, she owned and operated Jacob O'Hara Inc., a plant business in New York. She auctioned off plants and provided advice to people about caring for their plants.

Family
O'Hara was married to August Dorr Watkins, an interior designer and former actor, from 1968 until their 1974 divorce.  Since 1986, she has been married to British-born American actor Nick Ullett. They have two adult daughters.

Filmography

Film

Television

Video games

References

External links
 
 

1942 births
American film actresses
American stage actresses
American television actresses
American video game actresses
American voice actresses
Actresses from California
Actresses from Pennsylvania
Living people
People from Warren County, Pennsylvania
People from Sonora, California
20th-century American actresses
21st-century American actresses
Carnegie Mellon University alumni